Hästens Sängar AB, or simply Hastens (Swedish for "The horse's" as in "the horse's beds"), is a Swedish manufacturer established in 1852, that produces and trades in beds, bed linen, pillows and lifestyle accessories.

Hästens manufactures beds and mattresses by hand using natural materials like cotton, horse hair, wool and flax. Hästens retail stores also sell branded premium bedlinen, pillows, duvets and accessories. The company was founded by Pehr Adolf Janson in 1852 as a saddler business and is still a family-owned company. David Janson shifted their focus in the early 1900s from making saddles to making beds. By 1952, a century after its foundation, they had become the official bedding supplier of Sweden's royal court, a title they share with IKEA since 1984. The company continues to manufacture all beds in its factory in Sweden.

History 

Pehr Adolf Janson (1830-1885) was awarded his master certificate in 1852 by King Oscar I of Sweden. Master saddlers were also makers of mattresses, since horsetail hair was an essential material for the pads that went into the carriage. At that time, becoming a master saddler in Sweden required the certificate to be issued by the King himself.

In the late 1800s, the family moved to Hed and Pehr Adolf's son Per Thure Janson decided to follow his father's path in becoming a master saddler. Per Thure started a company together with his son David Janson. The business of making beds took off and they were soon producing more beds than saddles.

In 1939, British architect Ralph Erskine (1914–2005) travelled by bicycle to Sweden, where he later met David Janson who commissioned him to build the Hästens Factory, which was one of the first buildings that he designed in Sweden.

In 1978, Jack Ryde designed Hästens' blue check pattern that was presented for a furniture trade fair. The blue check pattern is a registered trademark for Hästens beds and is protected.

Hästens today

Markets
In 2006, Hästens was awarded the Swedish Trade Council's annual export award. At the time the brand was marketed in 22 countries, the largest markets being Sweden, Netherlands, Switzerland, China and the United States.

Hästens currently operates retail stores around the world in locations such as: Stockholm, London, Paris, Amsterdam,  Zurich, Frankfurt, Barcelona, Bari,  Brussels, New York, México City, Beijing, Taipei and Seoul.

Awards 
1952 - Purveyor to the Swedish Royal Court
2006 - Swedish Trade Council Export Award & Best International Growth Company by Ernst & Young
2010 - Wallpaper* Design Award Best Bed
2011 - Palme d'Or de la Literie de Prestige
2013 - Signum Priset Sweden
2015 - Hurun Report: The Best of the Best Awards 2015

Legal cases 
In 2000, a Swedish court ruled that Hästens was not allowed to advertise with phrases such as "The finest beds in the world" and "due to [our unique manufacturing process in Köping], we can offer 25 years' warranty on springs and frames". The latter was, among other reasons, because the springs and frames were actually manufactured by a subcontractor. Many companies have tried to copy the check patterns and Hästens has successfully undertaken legal procedures in several countries against infringements and counterfeits. As of 2011, the phrase "At Hästens we set out to make the best beds in the world." is used.

References

External links 
 

1852 introductions
Luxury brands
Swedish brands
Beds
Bed manufacturers
Mattress retailers of Sweden
Multinational companies headquartered in Sweden
Purveyors to the Court of Sweden
Swedish companies established in 1852
Manufacturing companies established in 1852
Shops in New York City
Companies based in Västmanland County
Sleep